Bernhard Germeshausen (21 August 1951 – 15 April 2022) was an East German bobsledder who competed from the mid-1970s to the early 1980s. Competing in two Winter Olympics, he won four medals with three golds (Two-man: 1976, Four-man: 1976, 1980) and one silver (Two-man: 1980).

He also won five medals at the FIBT World Championships with three golds (Two-man: 1981, Four-man: 1977, 1981), one silver (Four-man: 1979), and one bronze (Four-man: 1978).

Prior to his role in bobsleigh, Germeshausen competed in track and field athletics as a decathlete, winning the East German championship in 1974.

He later became a sports instructor.

References

 Amrhein, Klaus (2005). Biographisches Handbuch zur Geschichte der Deutschen Leichtathletik 1898–2005, 2 Bände, Darmstadt: Deutsche Leichtathletik Promotion- und Projektgesellschaft. 
 Bobsleigh two-man Olympic medalists 1932–56 and since 1964
 Bobsleigh four-man Olympic medalists for 1924, 1932–56, and since 1964
 Bobsleigh two-man world championship medalists since 1931
 Bobsleigh four-man world championship medalists since 1930
 

1951 births
2022 deaths
People from Heilbad Heiligenstadt
Bobsledders at the 1976 Winter Olympics
Bobsledders at the 1980 Winter Olympics
German decathletes
German male bobsledders
Olympic bobsledders of East Germany
Olympic gold medalists for East Germany
Olympic silver medalists for East Germany
Olympic medalists in bobsleigh
Sportspeople from Thuringia
Medalists at the 1976 Winter Olympics
Medalists at the 1980 Winter Olympics